do Amaral may refer to:

 Amarildo Souza do Amaral (born 1964), a Brazilian football player
 Carlos do Amaral Freire, a Brazilian scholar, linguist and translator
 Carlos Rafael do Amaral (born 1983), a Brazilian football player
 Crispim do Amaral (1858-1911), a Brazilian artist who painted the curtain at the Amazon Theatre
 Francisco Keil do Amaral (1910-1975), a Portuguese architect, composer, painter and photographer
 Francisco Xavier do Amaral (1937-2012), an East Timorese politician
 Maria do Carmo Estanislau do Amaral (born 1959), Brazilian botanist
 Tarsila do Amaral (1886-1973), a Latin American modernist artist

See also 
 Amaral
 De Freitas do Amaral (disambiguation)